Puerta del Sol is a city gate of Toledo, Spain, built in the late 14th century by the Knights Hospitaller. 

The medallion above the arch of the gate depicts the ordination of the Visigothic Ildephonsus, Toledo's patron saint. The name of the gate comes from the sun and the moon that were once painted on either side of this medallion. 

This gate was named because of its orientation to the east, where the sun always rises. The gate is no longer there, but the entrance is.

External links
Artehistoria.es: Puerta del Sol, Toledo 

Sol Toledo
Buildings and structures completed in the 14th century
Mudéjar architecture in Castilla–La Mancha